On 5 December 2016, at 23:30 IST, J. Jayalalithaa, Chief Minister of Tamil Nadu and the longest-serving general secretary of the All India Anna Dravida Munnetra Kazhagam, died of Cardiac Arrest at Chennai in Tamil Nadu, at the age of 68. Jayalalithaa's death was publicly announced at 00:15 on 6 December 2016. She was succeeded by her finance minister, O. Panneerselvam.

Government of India declared a one-day national mourning with the national flag in all government buildings flying at half-mast. Government of Tamil Nadu observed a seven-day state mourning period from 6 to 12 December 2016. Jayalalithaa's's lying in state took place in Rajaji Hall on 6 December 2016, during which time an estimated 1,000,000 people queued to pay their respects. It became one of the notable funerals in the world.

The state funeral service was held and Jayalalithaa was buried with her mentor M. G. Ramachandran in the MGR Memorial later that evening.

Background
On 22 September 2016, Jayalalithaa was admitted to Apollo Hospitals in Chennai, as she was suffering from an infection and acute dehydration. Her official duties were handed over to her minister O. Panneerselvam on 12 October 2016, though she continued to remain as the chief minister of the state. She was also said to be suffering from a severe pulmonary infection and septicaemia, which were cured. On 4 December 2016, she was re-admitted to the intensive care unit after suffering a cardiac arrest around 16:45 on the evening. The hospital released a press statement stating that her condition was "very critical" and that she was on life support.

Death and national mourning

Death and announcement 

On 6 December 2016 at around 0:15 IST, the hospital officially announced that she passed away at 23:30 (5 December 2016) and she became the first female chief minister to die in office in India.

Government of India declared a one-day national mourning with the national flag in all government buildings flying at half-mast. While a seven-day state mourning from 6 to 12 December 2016 was observed by Government of Tamil Nadu, also three-day state mourning from 6 to 8 December 2016 were observed by Government of Kerala and the Government of Puducherry. One day state mourning on 6 December 2016 was observed by Government of Karnataka,Government of Bihar,Government of West Bengal,Government of Punjab,Government of Uttarakhand and Government of Goa.

Lying-in-state 
Her body was kept in state at her residence Veda Nilayam in Poes Garden until the wee hours of 6 December 2016 and later at Rajaji Hall for public to pay their tribute.

State funeral
On the Evening of 6 December 2016, The Glass Casket carrying her Mortal remains was taken in an army truck bedecked with flowers for a 3-kilometer long grand public procession. Around million people paid an emotional farewell to Her. Late Jayalalithaa's body, draped in her favourite green coloured saree and kept inside a sandalwood coffin engraved with "Puratchi Thalaivi Selvi J Jayalalithaa". on the evening of 6 December 2016, Her long-time Aide V. K. Sasikala carried out the last rites, sprinkling rose petals, milk and holy water. Just after sunset, Jayalalithaa was buried into the ground at the northern end of the Marina Beach in Chennai near the grave of her mentor M. G. Ramachandran at the MGR Memorial.

Reactions

India
:
 President Pranab Mukherjee Condoled and paid last tributes on her demise, Stating:"Heartfelt condolences on the sad demise of Ms. Jayalalithaa, Chief Minister of Tamil Nadu. One of India’s most charismatic & popular leaders, Ms. Jayalalithaa was a visionary & able administrator". 
 Vice President Hamid Ansari said: "Jayalalithaa's demise is an irreparable loss to the people of India". 

Prime Minister Narendra Modi expressed his condolence and tweeted that "Jayalalithaa ji’s connect with citizens, concern for welfare of the poor, the women & marginalized will always be a source of inspiration".
 Union Finance Minister Arun Jaitley said: "Saddened by the untimely passing away of J Jayalalithaa ji, an exceptional leader and Chief Minister of Tamil Nadu."
 Union Home Minister Rajnath Singh said: "Deeply saddened to learn of the demise of Tamil Nadu CM,Selvi Jayalalithaa. She was a powerful voice for the weaker sections of the society."
 Union External Affairs Minister Sushma Swaraj said: "It is tragic. It is painful. She was a woman of dignity and self-respect. We shared a warm personal relationship."
 Union Commerce Minister Nirmala Sitharaman said: "Her life's journey is a story of grit & perseverance. Understood the mind of the poor & the women. Stayed connected to her people. Remember fondly the affection she showed each time we met. Condolences."
 Former Prime Minister Manmohan Singh said: "I join millions of admirers of Jayalalithaji in mourning her sad and untimely demise. She was a charismatic leader who will be remembered forever as the beloved Amma by the people of Tamil Nadu. She was an outstanding leader who was passionately devoted to the welfare of the people of Tamil Nadu."
 Former Union Minister P. Chidambaram said: "Jayalalithaa was most dominant political personality of Tamilnadu in last 25 years. Share grief of millions. Jayalalithaa acquired large loyal following that equalled that of her mentor MGR. She brought a hard uncompromising style to politics and governance that won praise and criticism".
 Lok sabha speaker Sumitra Mahajan said: "J Jayalalithaa ji was not only strong but also a good administrator. It is a big setback for politics. Not just Tamil Nadu but entire nation mourns the demise of Jayalalithaa ji. She was a very good administrator."
 BJP president Amit Shah said: "Saddened by the demise of Tamil Nadu CM J.Jayalalithaa ji. I extend my deepest condolences to her party and followers in this hour of grief."
 Congress President Sonia Gandhi said: "We pay our respects to J. Jayalalithaa ji. May her soul Rest In Peace".

Indian States
 Tamil Nadu 
 Governor C. Vidyasagar Rao said: "Deeply shocked and sad. People's Chief Minister of Tamil Nadu".
 DMK President M. Karunanidhi said: "I offer deep condolences on the passing away of Jayalalithaa. Wishes of lakhs of her followers will make her immortal."
 West Bengal Chief Minister Mamata Banerjee said: "Popular, strong, bold, efficient, people- friendly,charismatic leader, Amma. Always at the heart of people. Big loss. I am shocked, saddened."
 Andhra Pradesh Chief Minister Chandrababu Naidu said: "My deepest condolences to her well-wishers & supporters. She will remain in our memories as leader who truly cared for people".
 Madhya Pradesh Chief Minister Shivraj Singh Chouhan said: "Tamil Nadu Chief Minister Jayalalithaa's passing away is a great loss to the state and its people, we stand by them in this hour of grief."
  Maharashtra Chief Minister Devendra Fadnavis said: "She was one of the most respected leaders in the Tamil Nadu politics who earned the affectionate title of 'Amma' on account of her deep concern for the people. Her contribution in national and Tamil Nadu politics is immense. Jayalalitha always thrived for the welfare of women and poor". 
 Kerala 
 Governor P. Sathasivam said: "She was the greatest woman political leader in contemporary India. In her we saw the perfect blending of the strong will of an able administrator and the compassion of a philanthropist. In her sad demise, we have lost a unique mother’s touch that had brightened the lives of millions of people during the last three decades."
 Chief Minister Pinarayi Vijayan said: "Jayalalithaa was as an extraordinary politician with a rare political acumen and administrative skills, which made her a distinct leader in Indian politics. We do not have any other Chief Ministers in our country who have influenced people like this. Her passing away is not only a major loss to Tamil Nadu, but for the entire country". Opposition leader Ramesh Chennithala also condoled her death. A three-day state mourning from 6 to 8 December 2016 were observed by Government of Kerala
 Delhi Chief Minister Arvind Kejriwal said: "Very sad to hear the demise of Amma. A very very popular leader. Aam admi's leader. May her soul rest in peace."
 Puducherry 
 Lieutenant Governor Kiran Bedi said : "Ms. Jayalalithaa was a rare political personality who charted a distinct path of governance through her strong and able leadership. She was a multi faceted personality. the departed leader had always carved a niche for herself in all walks of life, be it as a student excelling in academics, be it as an artist, as a versatile actor and culminating in politics as a leader of the masses and eliteMs. Jayalalithaa had been a symbol of women empowerment and always had her heart for the cause of women. People of Puducherry shared the sorrow of the loss along with the people of Tamil Nadu".
 Chief Minister V. Narayanasamy said: “Jayalalithaa has done a lot of good work for the development of Tamil Nadu and for the welfare of the people. I mourn her death personally and also on behalf of the people of the union territory,”. Government of Puducherry observed a three-day state mourning from 6 to 8 December 2016.
 Jammu and Kashmir Chief Minister Mehbooba Mufti stated Jayalalithaa as "a leader of masses" and praised her women-specific initiatives. She said, "Jayalalithaa was an example personified of women empowerment who brought a unique style to country’s politics. Jayalalithaa would be remembered long for introducing many innovative schemes and programmes for public welfare. The late leader was one of the highly learned politicians of the country."
 Karnataka Chief Minister Siddaramaiah said: "J Jayalalithaa's demise is a huge loss. I am going to Chennai to attend her last rites ceremony."
 Bihar Chief Minister Nitish Kumar said: "It is unfortunate. It is a loss not only for Tamil Nadu politics but also for rest of the country. All of Bihar is in mourning today."
 Uttar Pradesh Chief Minister Akhilesh Yadav said: "The country as a whole will miss the charismatic leadership of J Jayalalithaa. Her schemes for the poor will continue to inspire governance."
 Rajasthan Chief Minister Vasundhara Raje said: "My heartfelt condolences and thoughts are with the bereaved family and followers. She shall be eternally cherished for her service to the people."
 Gujarat Chief Minister Vijay Rupani said: "Deeply saddened by the demise of Tamil Nadu CM Jayalalithaa ji. My thoughts and prayers are with the people of Tamil Nadu in this hour of grief."
 Odisha Chief Minister Naveen Patnaik said: "I am deeply shocked at the passing away of Tamil Nadu Chief Minister Selvi J Jayalalithaa. She was a leader of the masses and had made immense contribution to the development and welfare of the people of Tamil Nadu. She enjoyed a huge mandate and was known for her administrative caliber and political sagacity. She was the iron lady of Tamil Nadu who successfully steered the state on the path of progress and prosperity. Her benevolent measures endeared her to one and all. The people of Tamil Nadu affectionately referred her as Amma. Her death is a great national loss. The people of Odisha stand in solidarity with the people of Tamil Nadu in this hour of grief and bereavement. I pray that her soul may rest in peace."
 Assam Chief Minister Sarbananda Sonowal said: "Deeply saddened by the demise of Tamil Nadu CM Jayalalithaa ji. India has lost one of its tallest leaders. May her soul rest in eternal peace."
 Himachal Pradesh Chief Minister Virbhadra Singh said: "Deeply saddened by the untimely demise of Tamil Nadu CM Jayalalithaa. She has left a huge void in Dravidian politics. May her soul rest in peace."
 Telangana Chief Minister K. Chandrashekar Rao said: "I offer my deep condolences on the demise of "Tamil Nadu CM 'Puratchi Thalaivi' Kumari Jayalalithaa". Her political journey was a courageous one. Her demise is a deep loss to the Tamil society."

International 
The US and several other countries sent condolences. 
 : American Ambassador Richard Verma offered his message of condolence in a statement: "On behalf of the United States, I extend my deepest condolences to the family of Chief Minister J. Jayalalithaa and the people of Tamil Nadu following her passing yesterday. Chief Minister Jayalalithaa will be remembered for her years of public service to Tamil Nadu and as a supporter of closer ties between the United States and India. Our thoughts and prayers are with the people of Tamil Nadu during this time of sorrow". 
 : French Ambassador Alexandre Ziegler condoled her death and stating that "On behalf of France, I express my heartfelt condolences on the demise of Chief Minister J. Jayalalithaa. Chief Minister Jayalalithaa was a prominent leader who was loved and admired by millions. My thoughts and sympathy go out to her near and dear ones and the grief-stricken people of Tamil Nadu and India".
: Consulate General of Germany Achim Fabig sent a message of condolence on her demise. 
 : Canadian High Commissioner to India Nadir Patel issued a statement of condolence: "On behalf of the High Commission of Canada, I am deeply saddened by Chief Minister Jayalalithaa’s passing and I extend my sincere condolences to her family, and to the people of Tamil Nadu.Chief Minister Jayalalithaa and her valuable contributions to the people, development and progress of Tamil Nadu will not be forgotten". 
 : 
 Sri Lankan President Maithripala Sirisena expressed his condolences and stating that "I am saddened by the news of the demise of the Chief Minister of Tamil Nadu J Jayalalithaa. She was totally dedicated to the welfare of the people and was dearly loved by her people. India loses a female politician and a truly pro-poor leader, whom people fondly called Amma".
 Sri Lankan Prime Minister Ranil Wickremesinghe stated in a letter to Raj Bhavan: "Jayalalithaa was a visionary leader of our times. Sri Lanka mourns the loss of a stateswoman who upheld the welfare of her people and was much loved by them. Jayalalithaa leaves behind a legacy that speaks of political acumen and leadership skills. The people and the Government of Sri Lanka join me in offering our deepest sympathies".
 Former Sri Lankan president Mahinda Rajapaksa offered his condolences, stating "she captured the hearts of India's Tamil community".
 : Foreign Affairs Minister Vivian Balakrishnan wrote a letter of condolence to Chief Minister of Tamil Nadu O. Panneerselvam, saying:"The late Chief Minister Jayalalithaa dedicated her life to the socio-economic development of Tamil Nadu and through her leadership, Tamil Nadu grew to become one of India’s key economies and industrialised states. She was also a strong proponent of building closer relations between Tamil Nadu and Singapore. Her passion, energy and grand vision were so inspiring. India has lost a great daughter and Singapore a staunch friend.  It was therefore with deep sadness that I had attended her funeral to pay my last respects. Her Excellency Jayalalithaa left an indelible mark in Tamil Nadu and will be missed". 
 :
 Malaysian Prime Minister Najib Razak also conveyed his condolences and stating that "My condolences to the people of India on the passing of the late J. Jayalalithaa, Chief Minister of Tamil Nadu".
 President of Malaysia's Senate Vigneswaran Sanasee offered his condolences and stating that "I am very sad. All (of us) knew Jayalalithaa. She was also a famous actress. Hope the people (of Tamil Nadu) will be calm."
 Malaysian Indian Congress Party condoled her death and described her as a "Charismatic leader who had done a lot for the Indian people, especially concerning for welfare of the poor, the women and the marginalised community".
 : South African Tamil Federation (SATF) has called on all its affiliates across the country to host special prayer services for the late Tamil Nadu Chief Minister, describing her as "a friend of the Tamil community worldwide".

Others 
 Actor Rajinikanth said: "The brave leader’s loss is not just for Tamil Nadu, but for whole of India. My prayers for our respectful CM’s soul to rest in peace."
 Amitabh Bachchan, Shah Rukh Khan, Sachin Tendulkar, Rishi Kapoor, AR Rahman, Mohanlal, Mammooty, Mahesh Babu, Nagarjuna, Parthiban, Suriya Sivakumar and Other Film fraternity Condoled and paid last tributes on her demise.

Coverage
The News of Jayalalithaa's demise was covered by International Media such as BBC, The Washington Post, The New York Times, The Guardian and many more.

Succession and Aftermath
On 6 December 2016, O. Panneerselvam was elected as the AIADMK legisative party leader and Chief Minister of Tamil Nadu following the death of incumbent Chief Minister Jayalalithaa. On 11 December 2016, the AIADMK said that over 470 party workers died, 'shocked' by Jayalalithaa's demise, and announced a solatium of Rs 300,000 to each of their families. On 29 December 2016 – The AIADMK General Council appointed Jayalalithaa's Aide V. K. Sasikala as the temporary General Secretary of AIADMK until a formal election was held for the post.

References 

J. Jayalalithaa
J. Jayalalithaa
December 2016 events in India
J. Jayalalithaa